Phosphatidylinositol transfer protein (PITP) or priming in exocytosis protein 3 (PEP3) is a ubiquitous cytosolic domain involved in transport of phospholipids from their site of synthesis in the endoplasmic reticulum and Golgi to other
cell membranes.

Biological function
PITP has been also shown to be an essential component of the polyphosphoinositide synthesis machinery and is hence required for proper signalling by epidermal growth factor and f-Met-Leu-Phe, as well as for exocytosis. The role of PITP in polyphosphoinositide synthesis may also explain its involvement in intracellular vesicular traffic.

Structure and evolution

Along with the structurally unrelated Sec14p family (found in ), this family can bind/exchange one molecule of phosphatidylinositol (PI) or phosphatidylcholine (PC) and thus aids their transfer between different membrane compartments. There are three sub-families - all share an N-terminal PITP-like domain, whose sequence is highly conserved. It is described as consisting of three regions. The N-terminal region is thought to bind the lipid and contains two helices and an eight-stranded, mostly antiparallel beta-sheet. An intervening loop region, which is thought to play a role in protein-protein interactions, separates this from the C-terminal region, which exhibits the greatest sequence variation and may be involved in membrane binding. This motif marks PITP as part of the larger SRPBCC (START/RHOalphaC/PITP/Bet v1/CoxG/CalC) domain superfamily.

PITP alpha (UniProt ) has a 16-fold greater affinity for PI than PC. Together with PITP beta (UniProt ), it is expressed ubiquitously in all tissues.

Human proteins
The family of human phosphatidylinositol transfer proteins has several members:

Phosphatidylinositol transfer protein, alpha (PITPNA)
Phosphatidylinositol transfer protein, beta (PITPNB)
Phosphatidylinositol transfer protein, cytoplasmic 1 (PITPNC)
Phosphatidylinositol transfer protein, membrane-associated 1 (PITPNM1)
Phosphatidylinositol transfer protein, membrane-associated 2 (PITPNM2)
PITPNM family member 3 (PITPNM3)

References

Protein domains
Protein families
Peripheral membrane proteins